Dimitrios Mougios (born 13 October 1981 in Marousi, Athina) is a Greek rower.

Career
Mougios won the silver medal in men's lightweight double sculls with Vasileios Polymeros at the 2008 Summer Olympics in Beijing, China.

References
sports-reference

1981 births
Living people
Greek male rowers
Olympic silver medalists for Greece
Olympic rowers of Greece
Rowers at the 2008 Summer Olympics
Rowers from Athens
Olympic medalists in rowing
Medalists at the 2008 Summer Olympics
European champions for Greece
World Rowing Championships medalists for Greece
European Rowing Championships medalists